The inferior phrenic veins drain the diaphragm and follow the course of the inferior phrenic arteries;
 the right ends in the inferior vena cava;
 the left is often represented by two branches, 
 one of which ends in the left renal or suprarenal vein, 
 while the other passes in front of the esophageal hiatus in the diaphragm and opens into the inferior vena cava.

References

Veins of the torso